Chromodoris quadricolor is a species of very colourful sea slug, a dorid nudibranch, a marine opisthobranch gastropod mollusc. The specific epithet quadricolor means four-coloured, so-named because this nudibranch is yellow, white, blue and black in color.

Distribution
This dorid nudibranch was described from the Red Sea where it is one of the commonest nudibranchs. It has been reported from other localities in the Western Indian Ocean.

Ecology
This species feeds on the red sponge Negombata magnifica (Keller, 1889).

References

External links
 

Chromodorididae
Gastropods described in 1828